John Fell (January 21, 1819 – February 5, 1901) was an Ontario businessman, farmer and political figure. He represented Victoria North from 1883 to 1890 as a Conservative member.

He was born in Ingleby Greenhow, Yorkshire, England in 1819, the son of a farmer, and grew up there. He married Jane Carling in 1842 Fell came to Durham County, Canada West in 1854. He first settled at Cavan but moved to Somerville Township in 1860. He operated a sawmill and shingle mill. Fell was reeve of Somerville and warden for Victoria County. He also served as postmaster for Bury's Green. He ran unsuccessfully in Victoria North in 1879.

References

External links 
The Canadian parliamentary companion, 1885 JA Gemmill

1819 births
1901 deaths
People from Hambleton District
Progressive Conservative Party of Ontario MPPs